Oya lélé is the fifth studio album by the Belgian music trio K3. The album was released on 5 September 2003 through label Studio 100. The album is a typical kids-pop album with summer-vibes. Four singles were released to promote the album: "De 3 biggetjes", "Oya lélé", "Frans liedje" and "Hart verloren". The album reached the peak position in both the Dutch and Flemish album charts.

Oya lélé also contains the intro tune of the K3 talkshow De Wereld van K3. The song "Dat ding dat je doet" features vocals from Belgian singer Marcel Vanthilt. In 2009 a reissue of the album was released, which contains the original songs as well as karaoke versions of all the songs.

Track listing

Chart performance

Weekly charts

Year-end charts

Certifications

References

2003 albums
K3 (band) albums